Faint of Heart

"Faint of Heart", song by Vince Gill from These Days (Vince Gill album)
"Faint of Heart", song by Zion 1 and The Grouch from Heroes in the City of Dope 2006
"Faint of Heart", song by Tegan and Sara from Love You to Death (album) 2013
"The Faint of Heart", song by Gina Jeffreys from Somebody's Daughter (album)